The motor yacht Titanic is a 1,900-tonne yacht that was formerly the Japanese Government's research/fishing vessel Toko Maru and later Kelso. In March 2010, she developed a leak while sailing in the Caribbean.  Her rescue by the United States Coast Guard was co-ordinated from the United Kingdom.

Description
Originally built in 1971, Titanic is a former research/fishing boat. She is powered by four Niigata 6MQG31EZ diesel engines. The vessel is currently being reconfigured to accept 4 HS Turbochargers 4800 series turbochargers. She displaces 1,900 tonnes. Her IMO Number is 7338561.

History
The ship was built in 1971 by Hayashikane Shipbuilding & Engineering Co Ltd, Nagasaki as Toko Maru. In 1996, she was sold to Premier Fishing, South Africa and renamed Kelso. In 2009, she was sold to Bill Schlagel of California who intended to convert her into a luxury motor yacht, and renamed her Titanic. On 16 August 2009, Titanic visited St Helena where it was discovered that she was not displaying her name. The vessel's name was not on shipping registers either. It was established that the vessel was bona fide. She departed the next day.

Titanic is now owned by White Star Line Ltd. On 31 March 2010, Titanic developed a leak while on a voyage from Grenada to Puerto Rico where she was to undergo a refit.> Crew member Mark Corbett used the yacht's satellite phone to call his best friend Alex Evans' mobile phone. Evans received the call while in a DIY shop in Aberystwyth, Wales.

The MRCC contacted the United States Coast Guard at Portsmouth, Virginia who relayed a message to colleagues at San Juan, Puerto Rico. A French aircraft was sent to search for Titanic. A United States Coast Guard helicopter was despatched from CGAS Borinquem, Puerto Rico. The tow was later taken over by the  tug Mitchel. The yacht was taken to Frederiksted, United States Virgin Islands; none of the crew were injured despite their ordeal.

References

1971 ships
Merchant ships of Japan
Research vessels of Japan
Merchant ships of Panama
Merchant ships of Belize
Merchant ships of Saint Kitts and Nevis
Maritime incidents in 2010
Ships built in Japan